Miguel Contreras Torres (September 28, 1899 – June 5, 1981) was a Mexican-born actor, screenwriter, film producer and director.

Selected filmography

Director
 Juárez y Maximiliano (1934)
 No te engañes corazón (1936)
 La paloma (1937)
 The Mad Empress (1939)
 Simón Bolívar (1942)
 María Magdalena: Pecadora de Magdala (1946)
 Pancho Villa Returns (1950)
 Vuelve Pancho Villa (1950) (alternate version of Pancho Villa Returns, but with Pedro Armendariz replacing Leo Carrillo in the title role
 Under the Sky of Spain (1953)
 Tehuantepec (1954)

Producer
 Madman and Vagabond (1946)

Bibliography
 Noble, Andrea. Mexican National Cinema. Routledge, 2005.

External links

1899 births
1981 deaths
Mexican film directors
Mexican male film actors
Mexican film producers
People from Morelia
Male actors from Michoacán
Writers from Michoacán
20th-century Mexican screenwriters
20th-century Mexican male writers